Calhoun County is a county in the U.S. state of Michigan. As of the 2020 Census, the population was 134,310. The county seat is Marshall. The county was established on October 19, 1829, and named after John C. Calhoun, who was at the time Vice President under Andrew Jackson, making it one of Michigan's Cabinet counties. County government was first organized on March 6, 1833. Calhoun County comprises the Battle Creek Metropolitan Statistical Area and is included in the Kalamazoo-Battle Creek-Portage Combined Statistical Area.

Geography

Geographic features
 Kalamazoo River
 Battle Creek River
 St. Joseph River (Lake Michigan)
 Goguac Lake

Adjacent counties
 Eaton County - north
 Barry County - northwest
 Jackson County - east
 Kalamazoo County - west
 Hillsdale County - southeast
 Branch County - south
 St. Joseph County - southwest

History
The Kalamazoo River oil spill occurred in July 2010 when a pipeline operated by Enbridge (Line 6B) burst and flowed into Talmadge Creek, a tributary of the Kalamazoo River. A six-foot break in the pipeline resulted in the largest inland oil spill, and one of the costliest spills in U.S. history. The pipeline carries diluted bitumen (dilbit), a heavy crude oil from Canada's Athabasca oil sands to the United States. Following the spill, the volatile hydrocarbon diluents evaporated, leaving the heavier bitumen to sink in the water column. Thirty-five miles of the Kalamazoo River were closed for clean-up until June 2012, when portions of the river were re-opened. On March 14, 2013, the Environmental Protection Agency (EPA) ordered Enbridge to return to dredge portions of the river to remove submerged oil and oil-contaminated sediment.

Demographics

The 2010 United States Census indicates Calhoun County had a 2010 population of 136,146. This is a decrease of -1,839 people from the 2000 United States Census. Overall, the county had a -1.3% growth rate during this ten-year period. In 2010 there were 54,016 households and 35,220 families in the county. The population density was 192.8 per square mile (74.4 square kilometers). There were 61,042 housing units at an average density of 86.4 per square mile (33.4 square kilometers). The racial and ethnic makeup of the county was 79.8% White, 10.7% Black or African American, 0.5% Native American, 1.6% Asian, 4.5% Hispanic or Latino, 0.1% from other races, and 2.7% from two or more races.

There were 54,016 households, out of which 31.2% had children under the age of 18 living with them, 45.3% were husband and wife families, 14.6% had a female householder with no husband present, 34.8% were non-families, and 28.8% were made up of individuals. The average household size was 2.44 and the average family size was 2.98.

In the county, the population was spread out, with 24.2% under age of 18, 9.3% from 18 to 24, 24.0% from 25 to 44, 27.7% from 45 to 64, and 14.8% who were 65 years of age or older. The median age was 39 years. For every 100 females there were 95.5 males. For every 100 females age 18 and over, there were 92.5 males.

The 2010 American Community Survey 1-year estimate indicates the median income for a household in the county was $42,921 and the median income for a family was $49,964. Males had a median income of $25,712 versus $18,298 for females. The per capita income for the county was $20,661. About 11.7% of families and 16.2% of the population were below the poverty line, including 23.9% of those under the age 18 and 5.8% of those age 65 or over.

Government

The county government operates the jail, maintains rural roads, operates the major local courts,
keeps files of deeds and mortgages, maintains vital records, administers public health regulations, and
participates with the state in the provision of welfare and other social services. The county
board of commissioners controls the budget but has only limited authority to make laws or ordinances.  In
Michigan, most local government functions — police and fire, building and zoning, tax assessment, street
maintenance, etc. — are the responsibility of individual cities and townships.

Elected officials
 Prosecuting Attorney: David E. Gilbert
 Sheriff: Steven Hinkley
 County Clerk/Register of Deeds: Kimberly A. Hinkley
 County Treasurer:  Brian Wensauer
 Water Resource Commissioner: Ron Smith

(information as of October 2020)

Communities

Cities
 Albion
 Battle Creek
 Marshall (county seat)
 Springfield

Villages
 Athens
 Burlington
 Homer
 Tekonsha
 Union City (partial)

Census-designated places
 Brownlee Park
 Level Park-Oak Park

Other unincorporated communities

 Albion Landing
 Babcock
 Beadle Lake
 Bedford
 Bentleys Corners
 Ceresco
 Charlotte Landing
 Clarence Center
 Clarendon
 Condit
 Duck Lake
 East Leroy
 Eckford
 Greenfield Park
 Joppa
 Lee Center
 Maplehurst
 Marengo
 Old Mill Gardens
 Orchard Park
 Partello
 Pennfield
 Pine Creek
 Pine Creek Indian Reservation
 Rice Creek
 Sonoma
 Springfield Place
 Stanley Corners
 Sunrise Heights (subdivision)
 Verona
 Walnut Point
 Wattles Park
 West Leroy
 Wrights Corners

Townships

 Albion Township
 Athens Township
 Bedford Charter Township
 Burlington Township
 Clarence Township
 Clarendon Township
 Convis Township
 Eckford Township
 Emmett Charter Township
 Fredonia Township
 Homer Township
 Lee Township
 Leroy Township
 Marengo Township
 Marshall Township
 Newton Township
 Pennfield Charter Township
 Sheridan Township
 Tekonsha Township

Historical markers
There are 83 recognized Michigan historical markers in the county.

See also
 List of Michigan county name etymologies
 List of Michigan State Historic Sites in Calhoun County, Michigan
 National Register of Historic Places listings in Calhoun County, Michigan
List of counties in Michigan

References

External links
 Calhoun Intermediate School District
 
 Calhoun County courts
 Calhoun County government
 Michigan Historical Markers including text and photographs
 National Register of Historic Places
 National Register of Historic Places.com - unofficial website
 Calhoun County, Michigan History and Genealogy

 
Michigan counties
1833 establishments in Michigan Territory
Populated places established in 1833